Cameron A. Gordon (born 1955) is an American politician who was a Green Party member of the Minneapolis City Council from 2006 to 2022. He was a co-founder of the Green Party of Minnesota and was called "the most prominent Green elected official in the US." Gordon was defeated for reelection in 2021 by Robin Wonsley, a member of the Democratic Socialists of America.

Early life and education
Gordon was born in Minneapolis, Minnesota in 1955. He graduated from Minneapolis's West High School in 1973. He earned a BS in secondary education from the University of Minnesota College of Education, graduating with distinction in 1977. He then attended the College of St. Catherine, focusing on Montessori education and early childhood development. He completed the primary level of the Montessori Teacher Certification Program in 1983 and the Prekindergarten Teaching Licensure Program in 1986. He taught at Child Garden Montessori School from 1980 to 1984.

Gordon co-owned River's Edge, a children's music company and child care program, from 1997 to 2005. Gordon was also an associate editor of the newspaper Public School Montessorian.

Political career
Gordon was a co-founder of the Green Party of Minnesota, which was established in two founding conventions held in February and June 1994.

In 1996, Gordon was the Green Party candidate for District 62A seat in the Minnesota House of Representatives. He was backed by the Minnesota New Party and received 25% of the vote, the highest percentage for a third party state office candidate in the state of Minnesota in 50 years.

Gordon ran for Minneapolis City Council in 2001. He was defeated by DFL candidate Paul Zerby by 108 votes.

Gordon served on the policy board of the Minneapolis Neighborhood Revitalization Program.

On November 8, 2005, Cam Gordon was elected to represent Ward 2 on the Minneapolis City Council, defeating DFLer Cara J. Letofsky by 141 votes (2481 to 2340). He was endorsed by the Green Party of Minnesota, of which he was a former state party chair. He is the only non-DFL member of the council, and was elected Minority Leader of the council in 2014. Gordon chairs the Health, Environment and Community Engagement Committee. He was one of two elected Green Party members in the Minneapolis municipal government along with Minneapolis Park and Recreation Board commissioner Annie Young until her death in 2018.

Minneapolis City Council

2005–2009
Following a clash between the Minneapolis Police Department (MPD) and cyclists participating in a Critical Mass bike ride in August 2007, Gordon arranged for a meeting in City Hall between police officials and the riders.

During the lead up to the 2008 Republican National Convention in Saint Paul, Gordon was a member of the city council's Free Speech Committee. In the 2011 book Globalization and the Demolition of Society, Gordon was criticized for his vote giving the MPD legal authority to break up groups of people that are 25 or larger.

2010–2014
Gordon partnered with the Minnesota Public Interest Research Group and students from the University of Minnesota to enact an ordinance in 2011 requiring commercial business owners in Stadium Village to recycle.

Following the June 2011 arrest of CeCe McDonald and second-degree murder charges, Gordon announced his support for her, calling the incident "another example [of] transgender women of color being targeted for hate- and bias-related violence."

With councilmember Don Samuels, Gordon co-authored a resolution in 2012 requiring Minneapolis to take steps to ensure the city addresses racial disparities in hiring, contracts, and promotions. The resolution was the first of its kind in the United States and declared institutional racism "a primary reason for unemployment disparities."

In 2013, Gordon supported the construction of protected bike lanes on Minnehaha Avenue. In 2014, Gordon introduced an amendment to include electronic cigarettes in the Minneapolis smoking ban. The same year, Gordon expressed reservations about the expansion of the Southwest LRT, ultimately voting against it, saying that he wanted his vote to reflect the remaining issues and concerns.

2015–2016
In 2015, Gordon co-sponsored a resolution to repeal ordinances in Minneapolis against spitting and lurking. Data from the MPD showed that, from 2009 to 2014, 59% of those arrested for lurking were African American. Gordon characterized the ordinances as a part of structural racism.

Later in 2015, alongside Congressman Keith Ellison and councilmembers Alondra Cano and Lisa Bender, Gordon showed his solidarity with Black Lives Matter protesters demanding the release of the police video showing the shooting of Jamar Clark. Gordon supported the demonstrators who set up an encampment outside the Fourth Precinct police station, drawing criticism from MPD Lieutenant Bob Kroll.

In March 2016, Gordon opposed a $129 million renovation of the Target Center arena, citing a requirement in the city charter that a referendum should be held for investments in professional sports facilities of over $10 million.

With fellow councilmember Abdi Warsame, Gordon authored the Bring Your Own Bag ordinance in 2016, which prohibited single-use plastic carryout bags with some exceptions. The plan originated in a citizen environmental advisory group.

In 2016, Gordon supported a proposal before the City Council to place an amendment on the ballot to raise the minimum wage in Minneapolis to $15 an hour.

In 2016, Gordon opposed a Minneapolis Public Housing Authority plan to tear down 184-unit Glendale Townhomes complex in southeast Minneapolis and replace them with a mixed-income development. He supported rehabilitation of the row houses and sided with Defend Glendale, a resident group opposed to demolition, writing, "I support Defend Glendale’s efforts to have their homes repaired and improved with no displacement and no gentrification." Gordon also worked with Defend Glendale on a historic designation proposal. Also in 2016, Gordon opposed a housing ordinance limiting the number of non-family members who may live within the same house. He deemed the ordinance arbitrary and said that it prevented the expansion of cooperative housing. Gordon proposed allowing landlords the ability to designate a single property that they owned an intentional community.

Gordon and councilmember Alondra Cano wrote a proposal for Minneapolis to study how it could end its relationship with banks investing in the fossil fuel industry, including Wells Fargo, which has ties to the Dakota Access Pipeline and also handles the city's financial activities.

Electoral history
2005

2009

2013

2017

See also
List of Democratic Socialists of America who have held office in the United States

References

External links
Gordon's city council page
Gordon's campaign website
Gordon's blog
Interview at Minneapolis City Hall, August 6th, 2007

1955 births
21st-century American politicians
Democratic Socialists of America politicians from Minnesota
Green Party of the United States officeholders
Living people
Minneapolis City Council members
Minnesota Greens
Montessori teachers
St. Catherine University alumni
State political party chairs of Minnesota
University of Minnesota College of Education and Human Development alumni
American political party founders
Candidates in the 1996 United States elections
Candidates in the 2001 United States elections